Dasuya (Dasua) is a town and a municipal council in Hoshiarpur district in the state of Punjab, India. It is one of the major subdivisions with 398 villages under its jurisdiction. This town has a great historical and mythological importance.

History
According to a report by The Tribune newspaper in 1977, the town is referred to in the ancient Indian epic, the Mahabharata, as being the seat of king Virata. In recognition of this, Dasuya is still referred to as Virat Ki Nagri today.

In the closing decade of the fourteenth century, Dasuya at least twice witnessed the passage of an army during the struggle against the Muslim conquerors, Abu Bakar and Amir Taimur. Later, in December 1557, the army of the incumbent Sultan Akbar, led by his governor of Lahore, Khizr Khan, camped at the town while dealing successfully with a threat posed by Sikandar Sur.

More recently, Dasuya featured in debates related to the emergence of Himachal Pradesh. Verma has noted that "Perhaps no other State of India has suffered as many territorial and political changes in recent times as the Punjab". Within the process of the linguistic reorganization of states, the claim that Dasuya should be incorporated into Himachal Pradesh on the grounds that it was the home of Dogras was rejected because that point was irrelevant to the linguistic issue. Dasuya remained in Punjab when the negotiations culminated in the Punjab Reorganisation Act of 1966.

Geography

Transport
The town has a railway station and various road links. It is located on National Highway 1A, which connects Jammu and Kashmir to the rest of India, and state highways connect it with the city of Hoshiarpur as well as Talwara and Hajipur. Other connecting roads link Dasuya with Amritsar, Daulatpur, and Kapurthala.

Tourism

The town is attempting to capitalize on its history in order to attract tourists. To this end, a grant of Rs 10.6  million was given by the Government of India in order to renovate the sarovar and a temple, and it was reported in 2009 that many people attend a historic Sarovar and gurdwara situated at nearby Garna Sahib.

See also
Tahli, Dasuya

References

External links
 Municipal Council Dasuya

Cities and towns in Hoshiarpur district